Niwaj Nagar is a village in the subdivision Narnaul of the Mahendragarh District in the Indian state of Haryana. It is approximately 5 kilometers from Narnaul and is connected by road. Narnaul is approximately 150 km from New Delhi, the capital of India. It has a well established Government High School by the name Lala Murlidhar High School, a small market, 2 temples and a community center (Tayal Dharamshala).  Munish Kumar Raizada, a Neonatologist is also from the village and his ancestors were the founder of the village. He has started a Mission India Foundation (MIF) for the benefit of the society and time to time vaccination programs are organised by him.

Adjacent villages
 Hazipur-  1.2 km
 Mandlana village  1.5 km
 Bani-  2.3 km
 Housing Boarding-  2.7 km
 NASIBPUR Village Near by Narnaul-  3 km
 NOONI MOUNTAINS RANGE-  3.7 km
 Village- Raghunathpura (Khalar)-  4.7 km
 DOHAN RIVER (way to Manaash Jat's Tubewell Baproli)-  5.3 km
 River of Dhohana Pachici-  7.2 km
 Nihaloth-  7.6 km

References

Cities and towns in Mahendragarh district